In Christianity, deliverance ministry refers to groups that perform practices and rituals to cleanse people of demons and evil spirits. This is done in order to address problems in their life deemed to be manifesting as a result of demonic presence, which have authority to oppress the person. Believers attribute people's physical, psychological, spiritual and emotional problems to the activities of these evil spirits in their lives. Deliverance rituals are meant to cast out evil spirits, helping people overcome negative behaviors, feelings, and experiences. Each individual event is different, but many include some or all of these major steps: diagnosis, naming the demon, expulsion, and some form of action taken by the exorcised person after their exorcism to keep the demon from returning. The distinction between deliverance ministry and exorcism is that exorcism is conducted by priests given special permission from their church, while deliverance ministry is prayer for people who are distressed and wish to heal emotional wounds, including those purportedly caused by evil spirits. In both cases in casting out spirits, adherents believe they are following the example of Jesus Christ and his disciples given in the New Testament. The doctrines and practices of these ministries are not accepted by all Christians.

History

Biblical precedent 
Many believers in deliverance ministry cite Biblical precedent as an authoritative source for their rituals; this forms a significant part in arguments surrounding deliverance practices. The Biblical precedent for cleansing people of evil spirits goes back to Jesus.

The New Testament mentions Jesus casting out evil spirits fifty-five times, but only describes the events in detail five times. He casts demons out of a man in a synagogue (Mark 1) and two men near tombs (Matthew 8). In both episodes, Jesus converses with the demons and they acknowledge him as the Son of God before he casts them out. This is a common occurrence in modern deliverance rituals as well. Jesus also casts demons out of a little girl (Mark 7) and a young boy (Luke 9), both events that the Bible expressly connects to strengthening the faith of their parents; modern practitioners of deliverance ministry interpret their experiences expelling demons as an opportunity to strengthen their own faith as well. Jesus heals a possessed man (Matthew 12) to show his Messianic calling and the fulfilment of prophecy, leading modern believers to see successful exorcisms as evidence of Jesus' power in their lives.

Jesus' disciples also cast out demons many times throughout the New Testament as a sign of their own faith in Jesus. This occurs both before and after Jesus' death. After his death, believers interpret the events as proof of the authority the disciples still have through faith in Jesus. Each exorcism event is different in the Bible, and the methods used to cast out demons change; some participants in modern deliverance ministry interpret this to mean that there is no "right" or single way to cast out demons, but that many methods may be used as long as they are rooted in Christianity. Practitioners of deliverance ministry pay careful attention to each of these Biblical examples as they navigate and interpret demonic activity and deliverance rituals in their own lives.

Post-Biblical deliverance practices 
Exorcism was practiced by Catholics throughout the Middle Ages. Martin Luther practised it in Germany during the 1500s as a way of participating in the "war with the devil," a tradition continued by Lutherans throughout the Reformation. He simplified the ceremony in order to avoid drawing attention to evil powers. Deliverance practices became somewhat more common and widespread with the growth of the Pentecostal movement, and especially with the Charismatic movement that began in the 1960s. These movements continue to understand themselves as part of spiritual warfare, in which Christians are understood to be at war with the forces of evil which work in the world in very practical ways, afflicting people with all kinds of problems (physical, emotional, spiritual). People believe they can combat these evil forces through the power and authority of God.

Sources of demonic presence 
According to believers in possession, demons are believed to be able to enter a person's life in many different ways. Some objects are believed, by their very nature, to harbor demons; for example, certain types of literature, especially if it leads the reader to question their faith; fantasy/horror novels or films, Dungeons and Dragons or other types of role-playing games, CD recordings of certain types of music, art with non-religious or blasphemous/sinful themes, or artifacts depicting pagan gods. Sacred texts(false religious texts) or simple decorations from a non-Christian religion may also be a hiding place for demons. Other types are objects with a sinful history (e.g. a piece of jewelry from an adulterous relationship, an object purchased with greed, etc.).

Places can also be reputed to contain demonic presence that can then enter the lives of people living or visiting there. Indian burial grounds and homes or rooms where violence or abuse occurred are said to be examples of this sort.

Demons can also be said to "run in families." The usual cause is ancestors who were Satanists, Freemasons, or witches, or who died unrepentant of terrible sins such as abuse, adultery, or murder. Some claim that negative traits and practices run in families because of demonic presence that are passed down from parent to child. Others claim that physical ailments and persistent problems such as poverty and addictive behaviors (drugs, pornography, etc.) can be caused by ancestral sin and the resulting family curses.

Methods

Diagnosis 
Deliverance ministries focus on casting out the spirit or spirits believed to cause an affliction. The person must first be "diagnosed" with the presence/possession of an evil spirit, which often requires the participation of a person who is trained or experienced in this area. This expert may ask questions to learn about the person's life, and try to discover if they have committed any sins that might invite a demonic presence; if they have, they must repent of that sin as part of the deliverance process. The expert might question the person about their relationships with their spouse, children, and friends, as poor relationships with closer circle may be evidence of a demonic presence. They may also ask about their extended family and ancestors, to determine if the demon might be the result of a family curse. They can attempt to discern, if an object or a room is the source of the demonic activity and help the person understand what may have attached the demon to that object or space. Some claim to "see" demons (or vague impressions of them) or hear their names through the Holy Spirit. Once the source of the demonic presence is identified, the way to cast it out can be determined.

Some believe that an ordained member of a clergy must perform the deliverance, while others believe that anyone can have that spiritual power. Diagnosis may occur in private spaces, or during public meetings as the Holy Spirit is invited to reveal the presence of demons in the attendees or while the "preacher" walks through the audience forcing demons to manifest themselves in the audience.

Naming the demon 
Revealing the demon's name may be part of the expulsion process, as it gives the preacher authority over the demon. This process is not required to cast out the demon and some adherents do not accept it (some believe that demons can give the wrong name), but others believe it is necessary. The presence may identify itself or be identified as a specific demon (e.g. Jezebel, Asherah, Baal, etc.) or its "name" might be the name of the sin or affliction it represents (e.g. rebellion, gluttony, sexual perversion, anorexia nervosa). Naming the demon is about specifically identifying the problem, and may prepare both the preacher and the person being healed to expel the demon. The "naming" process may also be connected to ideas of repentance, as Christians often require confession of sins as part of the repentance process.

Expulsion of demons 
Various methods are used to expel demons. Some adherents recite Biblical verses about casting out demons, or pray; many also invoke "the blood of Jesus," a reference to Jesus suffering for people's sins and intervening with God on behalf of humanity. In this context, invoking the blood of Jesus is calling on him to intervene specifically on behalf of the possessed individual. The person performing the deliverance might touch the possessed person, or anoint them with oil or water. People may also perform rituals over objects that contain evil spirits, destroy them by breaking or burning them, then remove them from the home. If a place has evil spirits because of sins that were committed there in the past, people may repent on behalf of those who committed the sins as part of the process of casting out the evil spirits. All of these actions are meant to force a demon to leave an afflicted person, place or thing. The demon may resist the expulsion using the body of the possessed person, and may speak, scream, cry, laugh, vomit, or lash out physically. For this reason, exorcism or deliverance rituals can be loud, dramatic, highly emotional experiences for those involved. Once the demon is gone, people often describe feeling as though a weight or darkness has left them.

Post-deliverance maintenance 
According to believers in possession a demon may return after a successful deliverance ritual. To avoid this, a person whose possession was the result of a sin, must avoid repeating that sin. If they do, it may invite the demon back into their life; other demons (not related to sin) may just be persistent and hard to get rid of permanently. As such, people may need to call upon the person who performed the ritual to do so again, perhaps multiple times for the same problem or demon.

Formal work of ministries 
Ministries can organize the removal from homes of items that are believed to harbor demons. Members are instructed to burn items that are related to idol worship, "demon drawing" symbols, and music that summons demons. Rev. Don Jeffrey, an exorcist in Arizona, states that any and all of these objects should be exorcised of any evil spirits and blessed before burning them or sending them to the dump. For example, some believe that ouija boards can act like a gateway for the demonic and must be exorcised and blessed, as the gate must be closed before it is destroyed.

For some Christians, deliverance ministries are activities carried out by specialists such as Bishop Larry Gaiters, Rev Miguel Bustillos, and Rev Vincent Bauhaus, or groups aimed at solving problems related to demons and spirits, especially possession of the body and soul, but not the spirit. Ministries like Ellel Ministries International, Don Dickerman Ministries and Neil T. Anderson explicitly teach that a Christian cannot have demons in their spirit because the Holy Spirit lives there, though they can have demons in their body or soul due to inner emotional wounds, sexual abuse, or Satanic ritual abuse. This is usually known as partial possession or demonic infestation, as opposed to outside demonic oppression which does not reside in any of the three parts of a person: body, soul, spirit.

Deliverance vs. exorcism
While some people interchange the terms "exorcism" and "deliverance", others draw a distinction between the two. According to the latter school of thought, exorcisms are carried out through the use of various rituals of exorcism, such as those in the Roman Ritual, and often utilize attendant sacramentals such as holy water, while deliverance involves ongoing counseling of the individual through various programs. Others claim that "deliverance" and "exorcism" refer to the same practice, but that exorcism is a more intense form and is used in more difficult or extreme cases. Deliverance ministries seek to remove any influences that allow the demon to take control over the individual. The individual must take responsibility and be involved in the process.

Some deliverance ministers do use crucifixes, holy water, and anointing oils, as well as the Bible. Some deliverance ministers who also use the term "exorcist" wear the clerical collar (first used by  Presbyterians) and also incorporate a stole.

Prominent figures

Frank Hammond and his wife Ida Mae have been called "perhaps the most influential practitioners of deliverance ministry." Their book Pigs in the Parlor: A Practical Guide to Deliverance, published in 1973, is one of the most influential books on the topic, and has sold over a million copies. In diagnosing demonic presence, they focused more on the moral, ethical, and spiritual signs of possession, rather than more dramatic physical manifestations like writhing on the ground. As the title indicates, their book takes less of a theoretical/theological approach to deliverance; it's meant to be used by believers in real-life situations, and includes tools like seven signs of demonic possession and how to recognize when a demon has departed following a ritual.

Reverend Bob Larson has also achieved widespread public notoriety, not just within the deliverance ministry movement itself. Larson is known for drawing media attention to deliverance practices; he performs exorcisms in front of live audiences, teaches exorcism workshops, and even had his own reality TV show, bringing a sort of theatrical quality to exorcism. His daughter Brynne and her friends Tess and Savannah were featured on news channels in 2012 under the title "the teenage exorcists," even gaining the attention of news organizations and publications as well known as BBC News and People magazine.

See also 

 Demonic possession
Exorcism in Christianity
 
Spiritual warfare
Charismatic movement
Bob Larson
Johann Blumhardt

References

External links 
 How Deliverance Ministries Lead People to Bondage
 Personal Freedom Outreach - Demons, Demons, Where Are All the Demons?

Spiritual warfare